David Moshé Faitelson Pulido (born November 8, 1968 ) is a Mexican-Israeli sports journalist who currently works for ESPN Deportes. He lives in Southern California and is married and has three daughters.

TV debut
Faitelson and José Ramón Fernández jointly formed a sport show in Mexico, called DeporTV. In between his stay at TV Azteca, Faitelson covered the World Cup 1986 in Mexico, the 1991 Pan American Games in Cuba for Mexico, the World Cup 1994 in the United States, the World Cup 1998 in France, the World Cup 2002 in South Korea and Japan, and the World Cup 2006 held in Germany.  Faitelson also covered each of the Summer Olympics from 1988 to 2012.

Recent years
After the 2006 FIFA World Cup, Faitelson was one of several journalists who moved to sports specific channels. Along with other DeporTV analysts, he joined ESPN Deportes. As of 2011 he covered Mexican football, baseball, boxing the Olympics, and other sports. He was involved in shows such as Fútbol Picante, SportsCenter, Cronómetro, and Nación ESPN.

"El Color"
Faitelson is known for his dramatic, inspirational reports on the colorful side of the sport. "El Color" is his trademark and is the best-received of Faitelson's journalism work. He authored several articles. His work includes interviews with athletes such as Lance Armstrong, Carl Lewis, Julio César Chávez, Pelé, Diego Armando Maradona, and Nadia Comăneci.

He wrote a memoir called 20 Años de Pasión y Polémica.

References

1971 births
Living people
People from Ashkelon
Israeli people of Mexican-Jewish descent
Israeli people of Cuban descent
Citizens of Mexico through descent
Mexican emigrants to the United States
Mexican television journalists
Mexican journalists
Male journalists
Mexican people of Jewish descent
Mexican people of Cuban descent